By around 788 BCE, a large settlement had been established on the northern bank of the Merbok River. The settlement was one of several in the Bujang Valley, covering the Merbok and Muda Rivers, about 1000 square miles. The Merbok settlement was built near the estuary of the tributary river, the Sungai Batu. Around 170 CE groups of Hindu faith arrived at Kedah, joining them soon were peoples from nearby islands and from the northern Mon-Khmer region. At the same time traders from India, Persia and Arab,  arrived the brink of the Malacca Strait, using Gunung Jerai the Kedah Peak as marking point. Ancient Kedah covered the areas of Kuala Kedah, Kuala Bara, Kuala Pila and Merpah.

Early west-coast trade centres are few in number as they were overshadowed by Kedah. Her nearness to the entrances to the Straits of Malacca — and more importantly — being on latitude 6° north of the equator, the same as Ceylon to the south of India, meant that ships sailing the Bay of Bengal in a sea lane heading due east or west between the two were in little danger of becoming lost. The early transpeninsular routeway is part of the sea trade route of the Spice Route for Arab, Persian, Tamil Nadu and India-to-China traders, as the route through the Straits does not seem to have been in general use. Early sea traders from the west, upon reaching the coast, engaged porters to transport goods by raft, elephant and man-carry along the rivers (Kelantan River, Pattani River, Pahang River, Muda River, Bernam River, Muar River, and others) to the opposite coast. The Sungai Muda in particular favoured the development of Kedah.

After the 7th century, Srivijaya subjugated Kedah, but due to her fame, Indian sources continue to depict Kedah. Early Kedah also supplied its own tin, and jungle products such as rattan, resin, honey, beeswax, elephants, ivory, areca nuts, sepang wood and black woods, as well as profiting from tax collections.

The early history of Kedah can be traced from various sources, from the prehistoric period to the archaeological site of Bujang Valley, the early maritime trade of India, Persia, and the Arabs to the written works of early Chinese pilgrims and early Chinese records, the Hikayat Merong Mahawangsa (known as Kedah Annals) to Al-Tarikh Salasilah Negeri Kedah.

Origins 
Austronesians began migrating to the Malay Archipelago approximately 3,500 years before present. It is widely now accepted that Taiwan is the cradle of Austronesian languages. Some 4,000 years ago, Austronesian began to migrate to the Philippines. Later, some of their descendants started to migrate southwards to what is now Indonesia and eastwards to the Pacific islands.

Ancient history

Austronesians were great seafarers, colonising as far as New Zealand, Hawaii and Madagascar. In some regions they intermarried with the local inhabitants (Orang Asli), becoming the Deutero-Malays. Possibly as early as the 4th century BCE, Austronesians started to sail westwards in search of new markets for their products.

Some Greco-Roman merchants in the 1st century CE described huge non-Indian ships coming from the east with rich cargoes, possibly from the Malay Archipelago. This would indicate that the Malay participated actively in Indian Ocean trade, and likely handled much of the traffic between Southeast Asia and India.

Three kinds of craft are described by the author of the Periplus: light coasting boats for local traffic, larger vessels of a more complicated structure and greater carrying capacity, and lastly the big ocean-going vessels that made the voyages to Malaya, Sumatra, and the Ganges.

Medieval history

Early in the Medieval era, Kedah became part of Srivijaya (a major power in the Indian Ocean trade). This led to rivalries with the Indian states, especially the Chola Empire from the 9th to 13th centuries CE. The Cholas had a powerful merchant and naval fleet in the Indian Ocean and the Bay of Bengal. In the early 11th century, Tamil Chola King Rajendra Chola I sent an expedition to attack Kedah (Sri Vijaya) on behalf of one of its rulers who sought his assistance to gain the throne.The Chola fleets successfully defeated the Srivijaya empire, captured and sacked Kedah.

In ancient Kedah there is an important and unmistakably Hindu settlement which has been known for about a century now from the discoveries reported 1840s by Col. James Low, later subjected to a fairly exhaustive investigation by Dr. Quaritch Wales. Dr. Wales investigated no fewer than thirty sites round about  Kedah . The results show this site was in continuous occupation for centuries, by people who under strong South Indian, Buddhist and Hindu influences.

An inscribed stone bar, rectangular in shape, bears the Ye Dharma Hetu formula in South Indian characters of the 4th century CE, thus proclaiming the Buddhist character of the shrine near the find-spot (site I) of which only the basement survives. It is inscribed on three faces in Pallava script, or Vatteluttu rounded writing of the 6th century CE, possibly earlier. One of the early inscription stones discovered by James Low, at Bukit Meriam and in Muda River, mention of Raktamrrtika. The word Raktamrrtika means ‘Red Earth’ (Tanah Merah).

Inscriptions, both in Tamil and Sanskrit, relate to the activities of the people and rulers of the Tamil country of South India. The Tamil inscriptions are at least four centuries posterior to the Sanskrit inscriptions, from which the early Tamils themselves were patronizers of the Sanskrit language.

In Kedah, an inscription in Sanskrit dated 1086 CE has been found. This was left by Kulothunga Chola I (of the Chola empire, Tamil country). This too shows the commercial contacts the Chola Empire had with Malaya.

An indigenous style develops

The Tamils coming from Southern India and the local Malays were already using the rounded script, or Vatteluttu writing styles which differed from the Devanagari script of Northern India. Vatteluttu was also commonly known as the Pallava script by scholars of Southeast Asian studies such as George Coedes and D.G.E. Hall. The Tamil script of Vatteluttu later evolved into Old Kawi script which was used in Java, the Philippines, and Bali as well.

There are stone inscriptions which indicate that the Kedah region at 400 CE or before was already an established trade centre. One of the early Malay texts include the karma verses refers to a king named Ramaunibham, who may be the first local ruler whose name is recorded in history. The history of this period showed the influence of Indian cultures on the region while the locals in return, influenced the Indians in their living skills on the sea and in the hills.

See also
 Red Earth Kingdom / Chi Tu
 Sultanate of Kedah
 Trade route
 Cities along the Silk Road
 Kingdom of Setul Mambang Segara

Notes

References

Further reading 
 The Encyclopedia of Malaysia: Early History, Volume 4 / edited by Nik Hassan Shuhaimi Nik Abdul Rahman

External links

 
Former countries in Malaysian history